William Bradford Wilcox (born 1970) is an American sociologist. He serves as  director of the National Marriage Project and professor of sociology at the University of Virginia, senior fellow at the Institute for Family Studies, and a visiting scholar at the American Enterprise Institute.

Early life and education
Wilcox was born on August 21, 1970. As an undergraduate, Wilcox was a Jefferson Scholar at the University of Virginia. He graduated with a bachelor's degree with high honors in 1992. He earned an MA with distinction in 1997, and a PhD in 2001, both from Princeton University. He held research fellowships at Princeton University, Yale University, and the Brookings Institution before joining the faculty of the University of Virginia, where he is a Professor of Sociology and director of graduate studies. His sociological research centers on marriage, fatherhood, and cohabitation, particularly on how family structure, civil society, and culture affect the quality and stability of family life, and the ways families shape the economic outcomes of individuals and societies. He teaches undergraduate- and graduate-level courses on statistics, family, and religion.

Work
Wilcox has authored and edited several books, and published numerous articles on marriage, fatherhood, parenting, and religion. His work has appeared in the American Sociological Review, Social Forces, and The Journal of Marriage and Family.

He has published articles in more popular venues as well, such as The Wall Street Journal, The New York Times, The Washington Post, National Review, and The Weekly Standard. As director of the National Marriage Project, Wilcox also oversees the publication of an annual report on marriage in America, entitled The State of Our Unions.

In the media
Wilcox's research on marriage, religion, and family life has been featured in the Los Angeles Times, The New York Times, The Wall Street Journal, The Washington Post, USA Today, Slate, The Huffington Post, National Review Online, National Journal, National Public Radio, CBS Evening News with Katie Couric, NBC's The Today Show, and numerous other media outlets. His work is also regularly cited in academic publications.

Testimony
In May 2014, Wilcox spoke along with several other experts at a meeting convened by the United Nations as part of the 20th Anniversary of the International Year of the Family. His topic was "The Family in Transition: Should We Be Concerned About Declines in Fertility and Marriage?"

Additionally, in February 2015, Wilcox testified before the House Ways and Means Committee's Subcommittee on Human Resources about the challenges low-income families face in today's economy.

Debate
In July 2012, Mark Regnerus's newly published study titled "How Different Are the Adult Children of Parents Who Have Same-Sex Relationships? Findings from the New Family Structures Study" prompted much criticism regarding its methodology and allegations that it was influenced by two politically conservative organizations that helped fund the study. Later, James Wright, editor of Social Science Research, identified Paul Amato and W. Bradford Wilcox as two of the three anonymous peer reviewers who vetted the scientific methodology of this study.

Bibliography

 Soft Patriarchs and New Men: How Christianity Shapes Fathers and Husbands, The University of Chicago Press, 2004
 Gender and Parenthood: Biological and Social Scientific Perspectives, Columbia University Press, 2013
 Whither the Child? Causes and Consequences of Low Fertility ed. with Eric Kaufmann, Boulder, CO: Paradigm, 2013.
 Soul Mates: Religion, Sex, Love, & Marriage among African Americans and Latinos, Oxford University Press, 2016
 Unequal Family Lives: Causes and Consequences in Europe and the Americas ed. with Naomi Cahn, June Carbone, and Laurie DeRose, Cambridge University Press, 2018

References

External links
 
 University of Virginia biography of Wilcox
 The National Marriage Project at the University of Virginia

1970 births
Living people
University of Virginia alumni
Princeton University alumni
Princeton University fellows
Yale University fellows
University of Virginia faculty